Ankyrin repeat and SOCS box protein 6 is a protein that in humans is encoded by the ASB6 gene.

The protein encoded by this gene belongs to a family of ankyrin repeat proteins that, along with four other protein families, contain a C-terminal SOCS box motif. Growing evidence suggests that the SOCS box, similar to the F-box, acts as a bridge between specific substrate-binding domains and the more generic proteins that comprise a large family of E3 ubiquitin protein ligases.

References

External links

Further reading